The African Studies Review is a peer-reviewed academic journal covering African studies. The journal also publishes book and film reviews. The journal was established in 1958 as the African Studies Bulletin, obtaining its current name in 1970. The editor-in-chief is Benjamin N. Lawrance (University of Arizona); the Deputy Editor is Cajetan Iheka (Yale University).

History
During its history, it published several supplements, which have now all been consolidated in the main journal.
Issue: Quarterly Journal of Opinion (1971–1999), later renamed African Issues (2000–2004)
ASA Review of Books (1975–1980)
Africana Newsletter (1962–1964)

Abstracting and indexing
The journal is indexed and abstracted in the following bibliographic databases:

Journal Prizes
The African Studies Review awards prizes to recognize the achievements in scholarship of African studies scholars. In 2001, the board of directors of the African Studies Association established an annual prize, the Graduate Student Paper Prize, for the best graduate student paper presented at the previous year’s Annual Meeting. While this is an ASA award, the winning essay is submitted to the African Studies Review for expedited peer review.
In 2020, the journal expanded its prizes to include the ASR Best Africa-Based Dissertation Award and the ASR Prize for Best Africa-focused Anthology or Edited Collection.

References

External links 
 

Publications established in 1958
African studies journals
Triannual journals
Multilingual journals
English-language journals
French-language journals
Academic journals published by learned and professional societies
Cambridge University Press academic journals